The 1826 Connecticut gubernatorial election was held on April 13, 1826. Incumbent governor and Toleration Party candidate Oliver Wolcott Jr. defeated former senator and Federalist Party candidate David Daggett, winning with 56.77% of the vote.

General election

Candidates
Major candidates

Oliver Wolcott Jr., Toleration
David Daggett, Federalist

Minor candidates

David Plant, Jacksonian
Timothy Pitkin, Federalist
Nathan Smith, Federalist

Results

References

1826
Connecticut
Gubernatorial